Jacob Gijsbert Boerlage  (18 November 1849 – 25 September 1900) was a Dutch botanist, who worked principally at the National Herbarium in Brussels.

Life 
Boerlage was born in Uithoorn, in the Netherlands on 18 November 1849. He received his doctoral degree (1875) from Leiden University. Initially he worked as a teacher in the Hogere Burgerschool in Amsterdam and Dordrecht.  In 1879 he began working at the National Herbarium in Brussels which in 1999 merged with National Herbarium of the Netherlands based in Leiden. In 1880 he became the herbarium's Curator.  He married shortly after becoming Curator and was later appointed as deputy director. In 1896 he became the deputy director of the Bogor Botanical Gardens (then called the Buitenzorg Botanical Gardens) in Indonesia. He died while on a scientific expedition to the coast of Ternate. He was elected corresponding member of the Royal Netherlands Academy of Arts and Sciences in 1900.

Legacy 
He is the authority for at least 564 taxa including:

References

External link

1849 births
1900 deaths
19th-century Dutch botanists
Leiden University alumni
Members of the Royal Netherlands Academy of Arts and Sciences
People from Uithoorn